Nicolò Barattieri was a Lombard engineer active in Venice of the 12th century. In 1180 he raised the Campanile of Venice to 200 feet. In about 1181 he built the first bridge across the Grand Canal a pontoon bridge that was the first version of the Rialto Bridge. Barattieri also erected the two columns in the Piazzetta di San Marco.

References

Engineers from Venice
Structural engineers
Year of death unknown
Year of birth unknown